Biancavilla is a town and comune in the Metropolitan City of Catania, Sicily, southern Italy. The town was founded and historically inhabited by the Arbëreshë community.

History
The town was founded on 8 January 1488 by Albanian refugees. Led by Cesare Masi, they arrived in an area called Callicari and received the "Licentia Populandi" privilege from Santapau and Centelles, the presidents of the region of Sicily. Therefore, Albanian people established in that area and founded the town. The area was subsequently called Albavilla until in the year 1599, when the name became Biancavilla.

References

Municipalities of the Metropolitan City of Catania
Arbëresh settlements